Mahua (Vidhan Sabha Constituency) is an assembly constituency in Vaishali District, Bihar, India.

Overview
As per Delimitation of Parliamentary and Assembly constituencies Order, 2008, No. 126 Mahua Assembly constituency is composed of the following: Mahua and Chehara Kala community development blocks.

Mahua Assembly constituency is part of No. 21 Hajipur (Lok Sabha constituency) (SC).

Members of Legislative Assembly

Election results

2020

References

External links
 

Assembly constituencies of Bihar
Politics of Vaishali district